Oxazole is the parent compound for a vast class of heterocyclic aromatic organic compounds.  These are azoles with an oxygen and a nitrogen separated by one carbon.  Oxazoles are aromatic compounds but less so than the thiazoles. Oxazole is a weak base; its conjugate acid has a pKa of 0.8, compared to 7 for imidazole.

Preparation
Classical oxazole synthetic methods in organic chemistry are
 the Robinson–Gabriel synthesis by dehydration of 2-acylaminoketones
 the Fischer oxazole synthesis from cyanohydrins and aldehydes
 the Bredereck reaction with α-haloketones and formamide
 the Van Leusen reaction with aldehydes and TosMIC

Other methods: 
 Oxazolines can also be obtained from cycloisomerization of certain propargyl amides. In one study oxazoles were prepared via a one-pot synthesis consisting of the condensation of propargyl amine and benzoyl chloride to the amide, followed by a Sonogashira coupling of the terminal alkyne end with another equivalent of benzoylchloride, and concluding with p-toluenesulfonic acid catalyzed cycloisomerization:

In one reported oxazole synthesis the reactants are a nitro-substituted benzoyl chloride and an isonitrile:

Biosynthesis
In biomolecules, oxazoles result from the cyclization and oxidation of serine or threonine nonribosomal peptides:

Oxazoles are not as abundant in biomolecules as the related thiazoles with oxygen replaced by a sulfur atom.

Reactions
With a pKa of 0.8 for the conjugate acid, oxazoles are far less basic than imidazoles (pKa = 7). 
 Deprotonation of oxazoles at C2 is often accompanied by ring-opening to the isonitrile.
 Electrophilic aromatic substitution takes place at C5 requiring activating groups.
 Nucleophilic aromatic substitution takes place with leaving groups at C2.
 Diels–Alder reactions with oxazole dienes can be followed by loss of oxygen to form pyridines.
 The Cornforth rearrangement of 4-acyloxazoles is a thermal rearrangement reaction with the organic acyl residue and the C5 substituent changing positions. 
 Various oxidation reactions. One study reports on the oxidation of 4,5-diphenyloxazole with 3 equivalents of CAN to the corresponding imide and benzoic acid:

 In the balanced half-reaction three equivalents of water are consumed for each equivalent of oxazoline, generating 4 protons and 4 electrons (the latter derived from CeIV).

See also 
 Isoxazole, an analog with the nitrogen atom in position 2.
 Imidazole, an analog with the oxygen replaced by a nitrogen.
 Thiazole, an analog with the oxygen replaced by a sulfur.
 Benzoxazole, where the oxazole is fused to another aromatic ring.
 Pyrrole, an analog without the oxygen atom.
 Furan, an analog without the nitrogen atom.
 Oxazoline, which has one double bond reduced.
 Oxazolidine, which has both double bonds reduced.
 Oxadiazoles with two nitrogens instead of one (e.g. furazan).
 Oxazolone, an analog with a carbonyl group

References

 
Simple aromatic rings